Jule Manon Flötgen (born 24 December 1991) is a German ice hockey goaltender and member of the German national ice hockey team, currently playing in the Swedish Women's Hockey League (SDHL) with Leksands IF Dam.

She represented Germany at the 2019 IIHF Women's World Championship. As a junior player with the German national under-18 team, she participated in the 2009 IIHF Women's U18 World Championship.

References

External links
 

1991 births
Living people
People from Wesel (district)
Sportspeople from Düsseldorf (region)
German women's ice hockey goaltenders
German expatriate ice hockey people
German expatriate sportspeople in Sweden
AIK Hockey Dam players
Göteborg HC players
HV71 Dam players
Leksands IF Dam players
Expatriate ice hockey players in Sweden